Catherine Mowry LaCugna (August 6, 1952 – May 3, 1997) was a feminist Catholic theologian and author of God For Us.  LaCugna's passion was to make the doctrine of the Trinity relevant to the everyday life of modern Christians.

LaCugna earned her bachelor's degree at Seattle University, her Masters and Doctorate at Fordham University, and joined the faculty at University of Notre Dame in 1981. There, she taught systematic theology to graduate and undergraduate students, eventually holding the Nancy Reeves Dreux Chair of Theology at the University of Notre Dame.

Trinitarian theology 
LaCugna, a Western Theologian, sought common ground with Eastern Christians through re-examining early Christian scholars or Church Fathers.  She rejected modern individualist notions of personhood and emphasised the self-communication of God.

Building on the work of Karl Rahner, LaCugna argued that the "demise of the doctrine of the Trinity" started when early church theologians had to respond to the teachings of Arius, arch-heretic of the Christian church. Arius' doctrine required a response, and the Church Fathers' response began the theological trek into speculation on the inner, hidden life of God, commonly referred to as the Immanent Trinity. Whereas before, theologians had concentrated on the nature of God as revealed in God's actions in history (commonly called the Economic Trinity).

According to LaCugna, the church father Augustine furthered this divide between economic and immanent Trinity with his psychological model of the Trinity, which described the inner life of God as being like a human's memory, intellect, and will. Thomas Aquinas's scholastic theology took theological speculation to a whole new level.

Against Rahner and Karl Barth(in Church Dogmatics I/1, §9), LaCugna wished to retain the use of the word persons in relation to the three persons of the Trinity.  Rahner's manners of subsisting and Barth's modes (or ways) of being she saw as too easily adopting the modern notion of individualistic personhood, instead of a relational and interdependent model.

LaCugna says that God is known ontologically only through God's self-revelation in the economy of salvation, and that "Theories about what God is apart from God's self-communication in salvation history remain unverifiable and ultimately untheological." She says faithful Trinitarian theology must be practical and include an understanding of our own personhood in relationship with God and each other, which she calls "Living God's life with one another".

LaCugna's doctrine of the Trinity has been challenged by theologians such as Nicholas Lash and James William McClendon, Jr.

Awards 
Professor LaCugna received two significant teaching awards from Notre Dame University. In 1993 she received the Frank O'Malley undergraduate teaching award, and she received the Charles E. Sheedy Teaching Award in 1996.

Published works 
 God for Us: The Trinity and Christian Life 
 Freeing Theology : The Essentials of Theology in Feminist Perspective

References 

1952 births
1997 deaths
Catholic feminists
Christian feminist theologians
Fordham University alumni
20th-century American Roman Catholic theologians
Women Christian theologians
Seattle University alumni
University of Notre Dame faculty
Catholic feminism